Gusevo is a village in Zalegoshchensky District, Oryol Oblast, under the administration of the Bortnovskoye Rural Settlement. It had a population of 3 according to the 2010 Census.

References 

Rural localities in Oryol Oblast